Cryptocatantops is a genus of grasshoppers in the subfamily Catantopinae, a group of insects primarily found in Africa. As numerous other genera, it is not yet assigned to a particular tribe.

Species
Cryptocatantops allessandricus Sjöstedt, 1931
Cryptocatantops crassifemoralis Johnsen, 1991
Cryptocatantops debilis Krauss, 1901
Cryptocatantops haemorrhoidalis Krauss, 1877
Cryptocatantops simlae Dirsh, 1956
Cryptocatantops uvarovi Dirsh, 1956

References

External links 
 
 
 Cryptocatantops at orthoptera.speciesfile.org

Acrididae genera